Epsilon Island in the Antarctic is a small island lying between Alpha Island and the southern extremity of Lambda Island in the Melchior Islands, Palmer Archipelago. The island was roughly surveyed by Discovery Investigations personnel in 1927. The name, derived from epsilon, the fifth letter of the Greek alphabet, appears to have been first used on a 1946 Argentine government chart following surveys of the Melchior Islands by Argentine expeditions in 1942 and 1943.

See also 
 List of Antarctic and sub-Antarctic islands

Further reading 
 Defense Mapping Agency  1992, Sailing Directions (planning Guide) and (enroute) for Antarctica, P 348
 United States. Defense Mapping Agency. Hydrographic Center, Sailing Directions for Antarctica: Includes Islands South of Latitude 60', P 155

External links 

 Epsilon Island on USGS website
 Epsilon Island on SCAR website
 Epsilon Island satellite image

References 

Islands of the Palmer Archipelago